Fighter Squadron 173 or VF-173 was an aviation unit of the United States Navy established on 11 August 1948 and disestablished on 1 February 1959.

Operational history

VF-173 was the first squadron equipped with the FJ-3 Fury replacing its F9F-6 Cougars in late 1954, VF-173 completed the carrier qualification of the FJ-3 aboard  in early 1955.

In September 1957, VF-173 participated in Operation Deep Water.

Home port assignments
NAS Jacksonville

Aircraft assignment
F8F-2 Bearcat
F4U-5 Corsair
F9F-6 Cougar
FJ-3 Fury

See also
History of the United States Navy
List of inactive United States Navy aircraft squadrons
List of United States Navy aircraft squadrons

References

External links

Strike fighter squadrons of the United States Navy